Up All Night – Deric Ruttan Live is the first live album by Canadian country music artist Deric Ruttan. It was released on September 20, 2011 by Black T Records and distributed by EMI. It was recorded live at the Calgary Stampede.

Featured musicians on the live portion of the recording are Deric Ruttan - vocals and acoustic guitar, Darren Savard - electric guitar and vocals, Travis Switzer - bass, Denis Dufresne - fiddle and vocals, Matthew Atkins - drums

Track listing

Chart performance

Singles

References

2011 live albums
Deric Ruttan albums
EMI Records live albums